The 1935 German Ice Hockey Championship was the 19th season of the German Ice Hockey Championship, the national championship of Germany. SC Riessersee won the championship by defeating ESV Fussen in the final.

Qualification round

First round

Group A

Group B

Group B Tiebreak

Final

Losers round

References

External links
German ice hockey standings 1933-1945

Ger
German Ice Hockey Championship seasons
Champ